Rancho San Jacinto Nuevo y Potrero was a  Mexican land grant in present-day Riverside County, California given in 1846  by Governor Pío Pico to Miguel Pedrorena.  At the time of the US Patent, Rancho San Jacinto Nuevo y Potrero was a part of San Diego County.  The County of Riverside was created by the California Legislature in 1893 by taking land from both San Bernardino and San Diego Counties.  The grant encompassed present-day Lake Perris.

History
Miguel Pedrorena (1808–1850) was married to Antonia Estudillo, daughter of José Antonio Estudillo, grantee of Rancho San Jacinto Viejo. José Antonio Estudillo was appointed administrator and major domo at Mission San Luis Rey in 1840.

With the cession of California to the United States following the Mexican-American War, the 1848 Treaty of Guadalupe Hidalgo provided that the land grants would be honored.  As required by the Land Act of 1851, a claim for Rancho San Jacinto Nuevo y Potrero was filed with the Public Land Commission in 1852,  and the grant was patented to T. W. Sutherland, guardian of the minor children of Miguel Pedrorena in 1883.

In 1853, José Antonio Aguirre (1799–1860) of Rancho San Jacinto Sobrante bought Rancho San Jacinto Nuevo y Potrero from the estate of Miguel Pedrorena.

See also
Rancho San Jacinto Sobrante
Rancho San Jacinto Viejo
Rancho San Jacinto y San Gorgonio
Ranchos of California
List of Ranchos of California

References

San Jacinto Nuevo y Potrero
San Jacinto Nuevo y Potrero
San Jacinto Mountains
1846 establishments in Alta California